Mega Movie Magic is an American television program that was shown on Discovery Channel as part of its Sunday morning children-targeted line-up. The program explored special effects used in films. It was produced by GRB Entertainment. The program was nominated for a CableAce Award in 1998, and "drew healthy ratings" in its first season. It began in 1997 as the children's version of Discovery Channel's 1994–1997 program, Movie Magic, and was shown during 2004.

References

1998 American television series debuts
2004 American television series endings
1990s American children's television series
2000s American children's television series
1990s American documentary television series
2000s American documentary television series
American children's education television series
Discovery Kids original programming
English-language television shows
Science education television series
Television series by GRB Entertainment